Oliver Robins (born July 22, 1971) is an American writer, director and former child actor.

Career 
Robins's first film roles were in the 1982 CBS TV movie Million Dollar Infield as Aaron Miller and the 1982 ABC TV-movie Don't Go to Sleep as Kevin. He is best known for his portrayal of Robbie Freeling in the 1982 feature film Poltergeist and its 1986 sequel Poltergeist II: The Other Side. His other feature film role was in the 1982 comedy Airplane II: The Sequel as Jimmy Wilson.

He made one television guest appearance in the 1986 Twilight Zone episode "Monsters!".

Robins left the acting business after 1986. As an adult, he returned to show business as a writer and director. In 2000, he wrote and directed his first film, Dumped, which was released directly to video, and also wrote and directed Roomies in 2004. He wrote the 1999 movie Eating L.A.. Following the deaths of Dominique Dunne and Heather O'Rourke, Robins became the only surviving Poltergeist child actor, as well as the longest-lived.

Filmography

Film

Television

References

External links

POLTERGEIST: The Fan Site - The Oliver Robins Interview
FRIGHT EXCLUSIVE INTERVIEW: OLIVER ROBINS

1971 births
20th-century American male actors
21st-century American male actors
American male child actors
American male film actors
American film directors
American male television actors
Living people